The 2018 Women's Australian Hockey League was the 26th edition of the women's field hockey tournament. The 2018 edition of the tournament was held between 6 – 28 October, and featured a new format from previous editions.

The finals phase of the 2018 tournament was held in the Queensland city of the Gold Coast, from the 25 – 28 October.

NSW Arrows won the tournament for the tenth time, after defeating the QLD Scorchers 7–6 in the gold medal match. Canberra Strikers won the bronze medal after defeating VIC Vipers 2–0 in a penalty shoot-out following a 4–4 draw.

Competition format
Unlike previous editions of the Women's Australian Hockey League, the 2018 edition will include a very different format. Instead of the tournament being held at a single venue, the teams will play at least one home and away match during the pool stage, before converging on a singular venue for the Classification Round.

The teams will be divided into two Pool A and Pool B, both consisting of four teams, with each team playing each other once. The teams will then progress to the Classification round, with each team playing a qualifying match, before progressing to either the fifth to eighth place playoffs, or the first to fourth place playoffs.

Rule Innovations
As well as a new format, the 2018 AHL brought in new rule innovations from standard international hockey.

Field Goal Conversions
When a field goal is scored the same athlete will have an automatic one-on-one shootout with the goalkeeper for an extra goal.

Power Plays
Each team possesses a five-minute Power Play to use at the end of either the second or fourth quarters, when teams are reduced to nine players each and where that team’s goals are worth double.

The allocation of Power Plays will be decided by the team which wins a pre-game coin toss. For example, if the coin toss winner elects to take their Power Play at end of the fourth quarter, the opposition must use at theirs at the end of the second quarter.

In the second and fourth quarters, the clock is initially set for 10 minutes, then re-set for a further five minutes for the Power Play. Play will re-commence with a centre pass taken by the team in possession of the Power Play.

Point Allocation
All matches must have an outright result so drawn matches will be decided in a penalty shoot-out. Match points will be as follows:

· 5 points for a win
· 2 points to each team in the event of a draw
· 1 point will be awarded to the winner of the shoot-out
· 0 points to the loser of the match

Participating teams

 Canberra Strikers
 NSW Arrows
 NT Pearls
 QLD Scorchers
 SA Suns
 Tassie Van Demons
 VIC Vipers
 WA Diamonds

Venues

Results

Preliminary round

Pool A

Pool B

Classification round

Quarterfinals

Fifth to eighth place classification

Crossover

Seventh and eighth place

Fifth and sixth place

First to fourth place classification

Semi-finals

Third and fourth place

Final

Awards

Statistics

Final standings

Goalscorers

References

External links

2018
2018 in Australian women's field hockey
Sports competitions on the Gold Coast, Queensland